Anthology is an anthology album from Christian rock band Decyfer Down. It was released after the release of their third studio album, Scarecrow. This album consists of songs from End of Grey, Crash and Scarecrow.

Critical reception 
Rating the anthology with 2.5 stars, Christopher Waggoner states that "This record gives the listener a perfect idea of the range of genres and stylistic elements that Decyfer Down has covered and displayed over the years in their albums."

Track listing

References 

Decyfer Down albums
2014 compilation albums